The 2017–18 Anaheim Ducks season was the 25th season for the National Hockey League franchise that was established on June 15, 1993. For the first time since the 2011–12 season, the Ducks failed to win the Pacific Division; snapping a 5-year streak. They later advanced to the playoffs, but were swept by the San Jose Sharks in the First Round.

Standings

Schedule and results

Preseason
The preseason schedule was released on June 15, 2017.

Regular season
The regular season schedule was released on June 22, 2017.

Playoffs

Player statistics
Final Stats
Skaters

Goaltenders
Final Stats

†Denotes player spent time with another team before joining the Ducks. Stats reflect time with the Ducks only.
‡Denotes player was traded mid-season. Stats reflect time with the Ducks only.

Transactions
The Ducks have been involved in the following transactions during the 2017–18 season.

Trades

Notes:
 This trade ensured that the Vegas Golden Knights would select Clayton Stoner in the 2017 NHL Expansion Draft.

Free agents acquired

Free agents lost

Claimed via waivers

Lost via waivers

Players released

Lost via retirement

Player signings

Draft picks

Below are the Anaheim Ducks' selections at the 2017 NHL Entry Draft, which was held on June 23 and 24, 2017 at the United Center in Chicago.

Notes:
 The San Jose Sharks' second-round pick went to the Anaheim Ducks as the result of a trade on June 20, 2016, that sent Frederik Andersen to Toronto in exchange for Pittsburgh's first-round pick in 2016 and this pick (being conditional at the time of the trade). The condition – Anaheim will receive the middle pick of Ottawa, San Jose or Toronto's second-round picks in 2017. – was converted on May 9, 2017, when Ottawa advanced to the 2017 Eastern Conference Final, ensuring the Sharks' second-round pick would be higher than the Senators' and lower than the Maple Leafs'.

References

Anaheim Ducks seasons
Anaheim Ducks
Mighty Ducks of Anaheim
Mighty Ducks of Anaheim